Yvonne S. Thornton is an American obstetrician-gynecologist, musician and author, best known for her memoir, The Ditchdigger's Daughters.

Background, education and career
Dr. Thornton was born in New York City and raised in Long Branch, New Jersey as the third of five children to Donald (1925-1983) and Itasker Thornton (1915-1977), where she graduated from Long Branch High School. Her father, a ditchdigger, and a veteran of World War II, had a dream for each of his six children, all African-American girls, to become doctors.  The struggle and story of this journey in spite of economic, racial and gender-based boundaries later became the subject of The Ditchdigger's Daughters.  She cited her experiences in her childhood as being highly influential on her choice to attend medical school.

Dr. Thornton graduated from Monmouth University, and was accepted to medical school at Columbia University College of Physicians and Surgeons.  During that summer, Dr. Thornton was the first contestant of color to appear on the original Jeopardy! with Art Fleming as host.
In 1979, Dr. Thornton and her husband volunteered for active duty in the United States Navy, received her commission as Lieutenant Commander in the Medical Corps and was stationed at the National Naval Medical Center in Bethesda, Maryland (Hospital of the President). 
In 1981, Dr. Thornton became the first Black woman in the United States to become board-certified in maternal-fetal medicine.  She subsequently practiced at New York Hospital-Cornell Medical Center in New York, Morristown Memorial Hospital in New Jersey and St. Luke's-Roosevelt Hospital Center in New York throughout much of the next two decades.  Her expertise as a pioneer in chorionic villus sampling drew the attention of Oprah Winfrey, who first invited her on her show in 1993.  In 1995, Dr. Thornton wrote The Ditchdigger's Daughters about her parents' dream of making their children doctors; the success of the book caught Winfrey's eye and landed Dr. Thornton a return appearance on the show.
The Ditchdigger's Daughters was critically acclaimed, translated into 19 languages and was turned into a television movie produced by the Family Channel in 1997, for which Kimberly Elise won Best Supporting Actress at the 1997 CableACE Awards.

In 1996, Dr. Thornton received her Masters in Public Health degree in Health Policy and Management from the Columbia University School of Public Health, and in 1997 she published her second book, entitled Woman to Woman. She eventually rose to the rank of full professor and was appointed to the faculty of Weill Cornell Medical College as Professor of Clinical Obstetrics and Gynecology in 2003. She now holds the faculty position of Professor Emeritus of Obstetrics and Gynecology at New York Medical College.

Personal life
Dr. Thornton married her medical school classmate Dr. Shearwood J. McClelland in 1974; he was the director of Orthopaedic Surgery at Harlem Hospital Center in Harlem, New York for 25 years.  They have two children, both are physicians, Dr. Shearwood McClelland, III and Dr. Kimberly I. McClelland. She has been a resident of Teaneck, New Jersey.

Awards and honors
Although most recognizable for the success of The Ditchdigger's Daughters in literature and television, Dr. Thornton has received numerous honors over the years, including several honorary doctorate degrees. Her second memoir, Something to Prove: A Daughter's Journey to Fulfill a Father's Legacy, was released in December 2010 and was named the Grand Prize Winner of the 2011 New York Book Festival.  Dr. Thornton was named the 2013 Living Legend by the Joseph Tyler Chapter of the National Medical Association. In its 250th year, Dr. Thornton has been honored in 2017 with the Virginia Kneeland Frantz award for Distinguished Women in Medicine——the highest recognition for an alumna of Columbia University College of Physicians and Surgeons.

Publications

 (2018) A Life-Saving and Life-Taking 19th Century Medical Instrument”   The Pharos, Autumn, pp. 20–24                                          http://alphaomegaalpha.org/pharos/2018/Autumn/2018-4-HalperinThornton.pdf
 (2011) Inside Information for Women: Answers to the Mysteries of the Female Body and Her Health. Ludlow Seminars, Ltd. 
 (2010) Something to Prove: A Daughter's Journey to Fulfill a Father's Legacy, Kaplan Publishing. 
 (1997) Woman to Woman: A Leading Gynecologist Tells You All You Need To Know About Your Body and Your Health, Dutton Adult. 
 (1997) Primary Care for the Obstetrician and Gynecologist, Igaku-Shoin, New York. 
 (1995) The Ditchdigger's Daughters: A Black Family's Astonishing Success Story, Kensington Publishing Co.

References

External links
 Official Website of Dr. Yvonne Thornton
 
 C-SPAN Q&A interview with Thornton, January 6, 2008

20th-century American novelists
American women novelists
American obstetricians
American gynecologists
African-American physicians
African-American novelists
Long Branch High School alumni
People from Long Branch, New Jersey
People from Teaneck, New Jersey
Monmouth University alumni
Columbia University Vagelos College of Physicians and Surgeons alumni
1947 births
Living people
20th-century American women writers
Columbia University Mailman School of Public Health alumni
Novelists from New Jersey
Women gynaecologists
African-American women physicians
20th-century African-American women writers
20th-century African-American writers
21st-century African-American people
21st-century African-American women